The Dagger in the Library (Golden Handcuffs in 1992–1994) is an annual award given by the British Crime Writers' Association to a particular "living author who has given the most pleasure to readers". Yearly shortlists are drawn up of the ten authors most nominated, online, by readers, and the final decision is made by a panel of librarians. It was sponsored by Random House until 2015.

Winners

2020s 
 2021 – Peter May
 2020 – Christopher Brookmyre

2010s
 2019 – Kate Ellis
2018 – Martin Edwards
2017 – Mari Hannah
 2016 – Elly Griffiths
 2015 – Christopher Fowler
 2014 – Sharon Bolton
 2013 – Belinda Bauer
 2012 – Steve Mosby 
 2011 – Mo Hayder 
 2010 – Ariana Franklin

2000s
2009 – Colin Cotterill
2008 – Craig Russell
2007 – Stuart MacBride
2006 – Jim Kelly
2005 – Jake Arnott
2004 – Alexander McCall Smith
2003 – Stephen Booth
2002 – Peter Robinson
2000 – 2001 – in abeyance

1990s
1997 – 1999 – in abeyance
1996 – Marian Babson
1995 – Lindsey Davis
1994 – Robert Barnard
1993 – Margaret Yorke
1992 – Catherine Aird

References

External links
Crime Writers' Association website

Crime Writers' Association awards
Awards established in 1994
1994 establishments in the United Kingdom
Mystery and detective fiction awards